Gilberto Jesus dos Santos (born 17 February 1997), known as Gilberto Jesus or Bahia, is a Brazilian footballer who plays for Santo André as a left back.

Club career
Born in Salvador, Bahia, Bahia joined Santo André's youth setup in 2016, after spells at Caxias, Novo Hamburgo and Juventus-SP. He was promoted to the first team ahead of the 2017 Campeonato Paulista, and made his senior debut on 2 April of that year by starting in a 2–0 home win against Red Bull Brasil.

On 18 May 2017, after featuring in five matches, Bahia was loaned to Santos until December, being initially assigned to the B-team.

Career statistics

References

External links

1997 births
Living people
Sportspeople from Salvador, Bahia
Brazilian footballers
Association football defenders
Esporte Clube Santo André players
Santos FC players